John Stephen (1934–2004) was a Scottish fashion designer nicknamed "The King Of Carnaby Street". John Stephen may also refer to:

 John Stephen (New South Wales judge) (1771–1833), judge in the Colony of New South Wales
 John Stephen (Maryland judge) (1780–1844), Maryland Court of Appeals judge

See also
John Stephens (disambiguation)